Mohamed Mansi Qandil (born in 1946 in al-Mahalla al-Kubra) is an Egyptian novelist and author.

Early life
His father was a simple labourer. Qandil went to medical school and worked as a country doctor before turning to writing as a full-time profession. He lived in Kuwait for several years, where he was an editor at the monthly magazine Al Arabi. As of 2015 he was the editor of the Egyptian magazine Ibdaa. He now lives in Canada.

Career
Qandil's first novel was called Breaking of the Spirit and dealt with the subject of workers' unrest in the delta region. Another novel Moon Over Samarqand was inspired by a conversation with a taxi driver he had met in Uzbekistan. This novel won the Sawiris Foundation Award in 2006. An English translation of Moon over Samarqand by Jennifer Peterson has been published by AUC Press. His 2010 novel A Cloudy Day on the West Side was shortlisted for the Arabic Booker Prize. An English translation by Barbara Romaine has been published by Syracuse University Press.

Apart from novels, Qandil has also published short story collections and children's books.

Awards and honours
Qandil won the Egyptian State Incentive Award in 1988.

Selected works
 Breaking of the Spirit (novel)
 Moon over Samarqand (novel)
 A Cloudy Day on the West Side (novel)
 A Dinner with Aisha (short stories)

References

1946 births
Egyptian novelists
Egyptian male short story writers
Egyptian short story writers
Living people
20th-century Egyptian physicians
20th-century Egyptian writers
21st-century Egyptian writers
Egyptian children's writers